Hiram Brown (January 23, 1801 – September 7, 1890) was an American politician who served as the first Mayor of Manchester, New Hampshire.

Background
Before he was mayor, Brown worked for the Amoskeag Manufacturing Company supervising the stonework used in the construction of the company's facilities.
 
Brown was elected in 1840 to the Manchester, New Hampshire Board of Selectmen.

Election and mayoralty

In the first city election of Manchester, New Hampshire Brown was the Whig party candidate for mayor. In the election held on August 19, 1846, no candidate received a majority of the votes.  Brown was elected mayor in the second round of the election held on September 1, 1846. Brown was sworn in as mayor at 10 A.M. on September 8, 1846 and served as mayor until his successor was sworn in on May 25, 1847.

Later life and death
Brown died on September 7, 1890.

See also
 List of mayors of Manchester, New Hampshire

Notes

 

1801 births
1890 deaths
New Hampshire Whigs
19th-century American politicians
Mayors of Manchester, New Hampshire